29th Street may refer to:
29th Street (Sacramento RT), Sacramento, California
Twenty Ninth Street (Boulder, Colorado)
29th Street (Manhattan), New York
29th Street (film) - a 1991 film by George Gallo